Prajwal Revanna (born 5 August 1990) is an Indian politician who is the member of the 17th Lok Sabha from Hassan Constituency and also the 3rd youngest member of parliament in India.

Early life and background 
He is the grandson of former Prime Minister of India H. D. Deve Gowda and son of H. D. Revanna, former Minister for Public Works Department in Karnataka state. Former Chief Minister of Karnataka, H. D. Kumaraswamy is his uncle. He graduated as a mechanical engineer from Bangalore Institute of Technology in 2014.

Prajwal was appointed Janata Dal (Secular) state general secretary on 27 November 2019. He worked for more than 8 plus years in JD(s) party.

Political career 

In 2014, He discontinued his MTech course in Australia to assist his grandfather H. D. Deve Gowda with the Lok Sabha 2014 Indian general election in Hassan District, Karnataka.

In 2015, he was among the 10 young aspiring politicians in India to be chosen by Commonwealth Parliamentary Association (CPA), the UK to be exposed to the British way of governance. Although he was a Janata Dal (Secular) member, his entry into politics was delayed when Janata Dal (Secular) party denied him a ticket in 2018 Karnataka Vidhan Sabha elections. Nevertheless, Prajwal was resilient and was to some capacity involved in the politics of Hassan.

He wanted his grandfather to contest from Hassan constituency for Lok Sabha 2019 Indian general election in Karnataka. H. D. Deve Gowda had given up the family stronghold Hassan district for Prajwal's debut into electoral politics and contested from Tumkur; H D Devegowda was the sitting MP from Hassan constituency. Prajwal's fortitude seemed to have paid off since he contested and won the Hassan constituency. The Janata Dal (Secular) party contested in the 2019 Indian general election in Karnataka from 6 out of 28 Lok Sabha seats, with Prajwal emerging as the only winner. Within 12 hours of having won the seat, saddened by his grandfather's defeat from Tumkur constituency he announced his resignation. Following his decision, H. D. Deve Gowda advised him not to tender his resignation.

On 30 September 2019 Karnataka High Court issued a summons to him over an incomplete election affidavit. Petitioners of the summons accused him of allegedly filing a false and incomplete affidavit with his nomination papers during the Lok Sabha 2019 Indian general election in Karnataka. On 17 January 2020 Karnataka High Court Justice John Michael D'Cunha dismissed the first petition filed by G Devarajegowda on grounds that the petitioner had not complied with the statutory procedure under Section 81(3) of the Representation of Peoples Act and one more election petition filed by A Manju against the election of Prajwal was dismissed on technical grounds.

References

External links
Official biographical sketch in Parliament of India website

India MPs 2019–present
Lok Sabha members from Karnataka
Living people
Janata Dal (Secular) politicians
1990 births
People from Hassan